Đorđe Milovanović (13 September 1956 – 15 February 2009) was a Yugoslav and later Serbian professional footballer who played as a midfielder.

Personal life
Milovanović was nicknamed Đoka bomba for his thunderous shot. His son Dejan is also a professional footballer. His maternal nephew is Branislav Ivanović.

Honours

Player
Red Star Belgrade
Yugoslav First League: 1979–80, 1980–81, 1983–84
Yugoslav Cup: 1981–82, 1984–85

References

External links
Profile at PlayerHistory

1956 births
2009 deaths
Sportspeople from Sremska Mitrovica
Yugoslav footballers
Serbian footballers
Yugoslav expatriate footballers
Serbian expatriate footballers
Expatriate footballers in Austria
Yugoslav First League players
FK Radnik Bijeljina players 
Red Star Belgrade footballers
FC Red Bull Salzburg players
Association football midfielders